New Canton can refer to:
New Canton, Illinois
New Canton, New Jersey
New Canton, Virginia